The Jean-Adret Stadium is the main Stadium for athletics in the Rouen area. It is the stadium for the resident club Stadium Sottevillais 76.

Historical 
The France Championships in Athletics took place there in July 2004.

The Sotteville-lès-Rouen international athletics meeting is held at the stadium every year in June.

Access 
 Public transport Rouen: 
 By car: Access by the A13 
 By train: Rouen station 
 By plane: Rouen Seine Valley Airport

References 

Athletics (track and field) venues in France
Sports venues in Seine-Maritime